Richard Edmund Neal (born February 14, 1949) is an American politician serving as the U.S. representative for  since 1989. The district, numbered as the 2nd district from 1989 to 2013, includes Springfield, West Springfield, Pittsfield, Holyoke, Agawam, Chicopee and Westfield, and is much more rural than the rest of the state. A member of the Democratic Party, Neal has been the dean of Massachusetts's delegation to the United States House of Representatives since 2013, and he is also the dean of the New England House delegations.

Neal was president of the Springfield City Council from 1979 to 1983, serving as mayor of Springfield from 1983 to 1989. He was nearly unopposed when he ran for the House of Representatives in 1988, and took office in 1989.

Neal has chaired the House Ways and Means Committee since 2019 and chaired the Subcommittee on Select Revenue Measures. He has also dedicated much of his career to U.S.–Ireland relations and maintaining American involvement in the Northern Ireland peace process, for which he has won several acclamations. He has a generally liberal voting record, but is considered a moderate on such issues as abortion and trade. In January 2020, Neal was inducted into the Irish American Hall of Fame.

Early life, education, and academic career
Richard Edmund Neal was born in 1949, in Worcester, Massachusetts, the oldest of three children of Mary H. (Garvey) and Edmund John Neal. He and his two younger sisters were raised in Springfield by their mother, a housewife, and their father, a custodian at MassMutual. Neal's maternal grandparents were from Northern Ireland and his paternal grandparents were from Ireland and Cornwall, England. Neal's mother died of a heart attack when he was 13, and he was attending Springfield Technical High School when his father, an alcoholic, died. Neal and his two younger sisters moved in with their grandmother and later their aunt, forced to rely on Social Security checks as they grew up.

After graduating from high school, Neal attended Holyoke Community College in Holyoke, Massachusetts, and then American International College in Springfield, with the assistance of survivor's benefits. He graduated in 1972 with a Bachelor of Arts in political science. He then attended the University of Hartford's Barney School of Business and Public Administration, graduating in 1976 with a Master of Arts in public administration. Early in his career Neal taught history at Cathedral High School.

Local government

Neal began his political career as co-chairman of Democratic presidential candidate George McGovern's 1972 election campaign in Western Massachusetts. In 1973 he became an assistant to Springfield Mayor William C. Sullivan. Neal was elected to the Springfield City Council in 1978 and was named President of the City Council in 1979. The following year he was named as a delegate for presidential candidate Ted Kennedy at the 1980 Democratic National Convention. While a city councilor, Neal taught history at Cathedral High School, and gave lectures at Springfield College, American International College, Springfield Technical Community College, and Western New England College.

In 1983, Neal made plans to challenge Theodore Dimauro, the Democratic incumbent mayor of Springfield. The pressure led Dimauro to retire and Neal was elected mayor. Neal was reelected in 1985 and 1987. As mayor, Neal oversaw a period of significant economic growth, with over $400 million of development and investment in the city, and a surplus in the city budget. He worked to strengthen Springfield's appearance, pushing to revive and preserve the city's historic homes and initiating a Clean City Campaign to reduce litter.

U.S. House of Representatives

Elections

Boland had alerted Neal of his impending retirement, giving him a head start on his campaign. Neal raised $200,000 in campaign contributions and collected signatures across the district before the retirement was formally announced. He was unopposed in the Democratic primary, and his only general election opponent was Communist Party candidate Louis R. Godena, whom he defeated with over 80 percent of the vote.

Neal has won reelection every two years since. Former Springfield mayor Theodore Dimauro, reflecting sentiments that Neal had an unfair advantage in the previous election, ran as a challenger in the 1990 Democratic primary. Dimauro's campaign was sullied by a false rumor he spread about the Bank of New England's financial situation, and Neal won the primary easily. He was unopposed in the general election, winning 68 percent of the vote. In 1992, his popularity was threatened by the House banking scandal, in which he had made dozens of unpenalized overdrafts at the House Bank. After narrowly defeating two Democratic opponents, he was challenged by Republican Anthony W. Ravosa Jr., and Independent Thomas R. Sheehan. Neal won with 53 percent of the vote.

In a Springfield Union-News poll taken in mid-October 1994, Neal was ahead of John Briare by only 6 percentage points. Neal went on to spend nearly $500,000 in the last two weeks of the campaign to defeat Briare. The 1994 general election also featured a third-party candidate, Kate Ross, who received 6% of the vote. With blanks, Neal actually received only 51% of the vote in 1994.

Since 1994 Neal has had little electoral opposition. He was challenged by Mark Steele in 1996 and easily dispatched him with 71 percent of the vote and ran unopposed in 1998. In 2000 he won the Democratic primary against Joseph R. Fountain, who challenged Neal's positions as "anti-choice" and "anti-gun". Neal had been unopposed in the general election since 1996, but faced Republican opponent Tom Wesley in the 2010 U.S. congressional elections, which Neal won by a margin of 57% to 43%.

For his first 12 terms in Congress, Neal represented a district centered on Springfield and stretching as far east as the southern and western suburbs of Worcester. When Massachusetts lost a congressional district after the 2010 census, the bulk of Neal's territory, including his home in Springfield, was merged with the 1st district, held by fellow Democrat John Olver. While it retained Olver's district number, it was geographically and demographically more Neal's district; it now covered almost all of the Springfield metropolitan area. The prospect of an incumbent vs. incumbent contest was averted when Olver retired. The new 1st was no less Democratic than the old 2nd, and Neal was reelected without much difficulty in 2012, 2014 and 2016.

In the 2018 Democratic primary, Neal defeated Springfield attorney Tahirah Amatul-Wadud, 70.7% to 29.3%. In the final days of the campaign Neal had $3.1 million in the bank to Amatul-Wadud's $20,000.

Holyoke mayor Alex Morse unsuccessfully challenged Neal in the 2020 Democratic primary election. In the 2020 election, Neal received the most PAC money of any candidate: $3.1 million out of his $4.9 million total raised.

Tenure

Neal has a generally liberal political record. He was given a 100 percent "Liberal Quotient" by Americans for Democratic Action (ADA) for his 2008 voting record, and the organization named him one of the year's "ADA Heroes". He was given an 8.19 percent "Lifetime Rating" by the American Conservative Union (ACU) based on his votes from 1989 to 2009. In the 110th United States Congress Neal voted with the Democratic Party leadership on 98.9 percent of bills; in the 111th United States Congress, Neal voted with the Democratic party leadership 95% of the time.

Neal served as a member of the House Democratic Steering Committee in the 105th Congress and was an at-large whip for the House Democrats. He is a co-chair of the New England Congressional Caucus, a group aiming to advance the regional interests of New England.

Economy and budget
With several committee posts, Neal has made economic policy the focus of his career, although his success has been mixed. He served his first two terms on the House Banking Committee, where he served on the Financial Services Subcommittee. As the banking reform law of 1991 was being drafted, he cautioned that President George H. W. Bush's proposal could negatively affect small businesses and minority-owned businesses. He introduced an amendment to require reports on lending to these businesses, which was adopted.

In 1993 Neal moved to the House Ways and Means Committee, where he currently serves. He has been chairman of the Subcommittee on Select Revenue Measures since 2008 and is a member of the Subcommittee on Trade. Previously he served on the Oversight and Social Security subcommittees. In the late 2000s analysts considered Neal a likely frontrunner for chairman of the Ways and Means Committee, and in the wake of Charles B. Rangel's 2010 departure he began actively seeking the post. In June 2010, while pursuing the chairmanship, he invited campaign contributors to a $5,000-per-person weekend fundraiser in Cape Cod. This drew fire from The Boston Globe, which criticized him for "[acceding] to the capital's money culture."

According to Congressional Quarterly's Politics in America, one of Neal's longstanding legislative priorities is to simplify the tax code. Neal has long advocated repealing the Alternative Minimum Tax (AMT), believing its effects have reached unreasonably low income brackets. He led an unsuccessful movement to reform the AMT in 2007. In 1998 he successfully pushed to exempt a child tax credit from being affected by the AMT, and in 2001 Congress made the exemption permanent at his urging. He voted against the tax cuts of 2001 and 2003, saying they would force millions onto the AMT. Another priority of Neal's is to eliminate tax "loopholes" that favor higher-income individuals. He was the lead proponent of a bill to require federal contractors to pay federal taxes for workers hired through offshore shell headquarters. The bill, H.R. 6081, passed both houses of Congress unanimously and was signed into law in May 2008.

On trade policy, Neal has a moderate record, supporting lower trade barriers. He voted against the North American Free Trade Agreement (NAFTA) in 1993. In 1995 and 2002 he voted against fast track bills that gave the president the authority to negotiate trade deals without amendments by Congress. In 2007 he voted in favor of the United States – Peru Trade Promotion Agreement despite some Democratic opposition.

Neal is a strong supporter of the Social Security program. He moved from the Trade subcommittee to the Social Security subcommittee in 2005 to challenge President George W. Bush's attempts to partially privatize it. He pushed a proposal to automatically enroll employees in Individual Retirement Accounts (IRAs), and successfully lobbied President Barack Obama to include it in a proposed 2009 budget outline.

In February 2019, Neal came under criticism for failing to promptly exercise his authority as Ways and Means Committee chair to subpoena Donald Trump's tax returns. Citing a need to build a strong case in a potential lawsuit, Neal delayed taking this step until May 2019.

In 2019 the House Ways and Means Committee led by Neal passed a bill that would prohibit the IRS from creating a free electronic tax filing system. During his 2016 and 2018 campaigns, Neal received $16,000 in contributions from Intuit and H&R Block, two tax preparation companies that have lobbied against the creation of free tax filing systems.

For his tenure as the chairman of the House Ways and Means Committee in the 116th Congress, Neal earned an "F" grade from the non-partisan Lugar Center's Congressional Oversight Hearing Index.

Foreign policy
 
Descended from Irish nationalist grandparents on both sides, Neal has been an advocate for Irish concerns throughout his Congressional career, pushing to keep the United States involved in the Northern Ireland peace process. He is the co-chair of the ad hoc Committee on Irish Affairs, has been chairman of the Friends of Ireland since 2007, and was considered as a candidate for United States Ambassador to Ireland in 1998. After the disarmament of the Irish Republican Army (IRA) in September 2005, Neal was among a group of Congressmen who met with Sinn Féin MP Martin McGuinness to congratulate him on the disarmament and ensure a lasting peace had been reached. Neal invited Sinn Féin President Gerry Adams to the inauguration of Barack Obama in January 2009. Neal has been named as one of the top 100 Irish-Americans by Irish America magazine and received the International Leadership Award from The American Ireland Fund in 2002.

Neal is an opponent of the Iraq War, saying it was based on false intelligence. He voted against the original invasion in 2003 and opposed President Bush's 2006 request to send additional troops. He cited veterans' affairs as his top priority in 2010.

In 2017, Neal backed the Israeli Anti-Boycott Act, aimed to punish companies that boycott Israel.

Health care 
A longtime advocate of health care reform, Neal was involved in the major health care reform efforts of 1993–94 and 2009–10. In working on the unsuccessful Clinton health care plan of 1993 he served the interests of the major health insurance and medical companies in his district, achieving a compromise allowing insurance companies to charge small businesses higher premiums. He was later involved writing the House's 2009 health care reform bill, the Affordable Health Care for America Act. As chairman of the Select Revenue Measures subcommittee, he had a hand in developing the bill's financing plan. He explained that his priorities were to address "pre-existing conditions, capping out-of-pocket expenses and making sure people don't lose their health care if they lose their job". Despite his support for the act, he spoke about his preference for a "piecemeal" approach to health care reform, saying it would allow for a more reasonable debate.

As chairman of the House Ways and Means Committee, before a March 2019 hearing on Medicare for All, Neal told Democrats on the panel that he didn’t want the phrase "Medicare for All" to be used. He argued that Medicare for All was wrong on policy and a political loser. In December 2019, some blamed Neal for killing legislation that would have ended surprise medical bills, suspecting it may have been because of industry lobbyist donations to his reelection campaign. As of the 2019–20 election cycle, Neal is third-highest among House members in campaign contributions from the health services/HMO industry. The insurance and pharmaceutical industries are among the top contributors to his campaign committee.

Retirement planning 

Neal introduced the bipartisan SECURE Act of 2019, which contained a number of provisions to expand access to retirement planning options and encourage employers to set up retirement plans for workers. The bill, originally introduced in late March 2019, became law in December 2019 as part of the fiscal year 2020 federal appropriations bill.

Abortion 

Representing a relatively Catholic district, Neal has a more conservative record on abortion than other representatives from Massachusetts. He said in 2010, "I have always opposed taxpayer funding of abortion. I'd keep Roe v. Wade and restrict it. I've always thought: keep abortion, with restrictions for late-term abortion. [Given] the voting pattern I have, both sides would say I'm mixed, and guess what? That's where the American people are." He voted for the Partial-Birth Abortion Ban Act of 2003, which made the intact dilation and extraction abortion procedure illegal in most cases. During debate on the House health care reform bill, he voted in favor of the Stupak–Pitts Amendment to restrict government funding of abortion. In 2021 Neal was listed as an original co-sponsor of the Women's Health Protection Act.

Other social issues 
On other social issues Neal has a moderate record: he supports a proposed Constitutional amendment to ban desecration of the U.S. flag, and has twice voted against an amendment to ban same-sex marriage.

Committee assignments
Committee on Ways and Means (Chair)
As the chair of the committee as a whole, he serves as an ex officio member on all the subcommittees
Joint Committee on Taxation (Chair)

Caucus memberships
Congressional Arts Caucus
Afterschool Caucuses
U.S.-Japan Caucus
New England Congressional Caucus (Co-chair)
Friends of Ireland

Personal life
Neal is a Roman Catholic. He lives in Springfield with his wife Maureen Neal, née Conway. They have four children: Rory Christopher, Brendan Conway, Maura Katherine, and Sean Richard. In addition to his duties as a congressman, Neal teaches a journalism course at the University of Massachusetts Amherst called "The Politician and the Journalist".

See also
Electoral history of Richard Neal

References

External links

Congressman Richard E. Neal official U.S. House website
Richard Neal for Congress

|-

|-

|-

|-

|-

Living people
1949 births
20th-century American politicians
21st-century American politicians
21st-century Roman Catholics
American LGBT rights activists
American International College alumni
American people of Irish descent
American people of English descent
American Roman Catholics
Catholics from Massachusetts
Democratic Party members of the United States House of Representatives from Massachusetts
Holyoke Community College alumni
Springfield, Massachusetts City Council members
Mayors of Springfield, Massachusetts
Politicians from Worcester, Massachusetts
University of Hartford alumni
University of Massachusetts Amherst faculty